Opera Ebony is an African-American opera company that has performed in a wide variety of programs and venues, ranging from Mozart in Harlem to African-American Heritage concerts in Iceland to Gershwin in Moscow to Duke Ellington in the Caribbean. Benjamin Matthews, Sister M. Elise Sisson, SBS (1897–1982), and Wayne Sanders founded Opera Ebony in 1973. The company has served as a professional platform for thousands of American artists, administrators and technical staff, helping them to refine their talent and perfect their operatic craft. In New York City, Opera Ebony has performed at Lincoln Center, Carnegie Hall, the Brooklyn Academy of Music, the Metropolitan Museum of Art, the World Trade Center, the Beacon Theatre, Langston Hughes Theater (Schomburg Center for Research and Black Culture), and the Manhattan Center. Additionally, for ten years the company presented grand opera at Philadelphia's Academy of Music. Since 1988, Opera Ebony's repertoire has found Brazil, Russia, Estonia, Sweden, Finland, Iceland, Canada, Switzerland and Martinique. The company has also partnered with several major international orchestras, opera companies and music festivals, including the Iceland Symphony Orchestra, the Finnish National Opera, the Estonia Philharmonic and the Savolinna Music Festival.

In 1998, Opera Ebony was selected as the only American opera company to perform for the opening of the Novaya Opera House in Moscow, Russia. During the winter of 2000, members of Opera Ebony appeared in performance and engaging conversation on the PBS GREAT PERFORMANCES series - "Aïda's Brothers and Sisters: Black Voices in Opera." For Black History Month 2001, the company joined with the Metropolitan Museum of Art to present the premiere workshop-performance of Harriet Tubman, a new opera/musical theater work by acclaimed American composer Leo Edwards.

Notable world premieres and commissioned works include Frederick Douglass (Dorothy Rudd Moore, 1985); Sojourner Truth (Valerie Capers, 1986); The Outcast (Noa Ain, 1990); Oh Freedom (Lena McLin and Benjamin Matthews, 1990); Journin' (Benjamin Matthews 1991); and The Meetin' (Pamela Baskin Watson, commissioned by Opera Ebony and the Jerome Foundation, 1998). Current projects include Harriet Tubman by Leo Edwards (commissioned by Opera Ebony and the Linda Gale Sampson Charitable Trust) and the remounting of The Meetin' for touring throughout North America.

African-American opera stars that were trained by Opera Ebony or have performed with the company include sopranos Mavis Martin, Jessye Norman and Kathleen Battle; baritone Lawrence Craig; and conductors Lawrence Craig, Leslie Dunner, Everett Lee and Tanya Leon.

Opera Ebony is the longest surviving African-American opera company in American history.

References

New York City opera companies
Musical groups established in 1973
1973 establishments in New York City